Boechera pulchra, the beautiful rockcress, is a perennial plant in the mustard family (Brassicaceae) found in the Mojave Desert and other dry regions of southern and eastern California and Nevada, and the Colorado Plateau and Canyonlands region of the southwestern United States, mostly below  elevation.

Description
Eight to twenty purple, rarely white, flowers are borne in a normally unbranched raceme. Sepals are hairy.

References

External links

Flora of the Colorado Plateau and Canyonlands region
pulchra